Echo is an Icelandic film from 2019, directed by Rúnar Rúnarsson.

Over a series of 56 vignettes, Echo draws a portrait of Iceland during the Christmas holidays.

Echo was nominated for Best Film at the Edda Awards, won Best Original Score at Les Arcs European Film Festival, and Best Director at the Valladolid International Film Festival.

References

External links 
 

2019 films
Icelandic drama films